NGC 106 is a lenticular galaxy estimated to be about 270 million light-years away in the constellation of Pisces. It was discovered by Francis Leavenworth in 1886 and its apparent magnitude is 14.5.

Notes

References

External links
 

0106
Pisces (constellation)
Astronomical objects discovered in 1886
Discoveries by Francis Leavenworth